Jobo was a French professional cycling team that existed from 1974 to 1978, with the exception of 1977. A notable result was the mountains classification of the 1978 Tour de France with Mariano Martínez.

References

Cycling teams based in France
Defunct cycling teams based in France
1974 establishments in France
1978 disestablishments in France
Cycling teams established in 1974
Cycling teams disestablished in 1978